Mastersia is an Asian genus of flowering plants in the legume family, Fabaceae. It belongs to the subfamily Faboideae. It contains two species, M. assamica and M. bakeri.

References 

Phaseoleae
Fabaceae genera